Edward "Eddie" Gray (born 19 October 1934 in Bellshill) is a Scottish former professional footballer who played as a forward in the Scottish Football League and the Football League in the 1950s and 1960s.

References

1934 births
Living people
Footballers from Bellshill
Scottish footballers
Kirkintilloch Rob Roy F.C. players
Hibernian F.C. players
Accrington Stanley F.C. (1891) players
Barrow A.F.C. players
Yeovil Town F.C. players
Stirling Albion F.C. players
Forfar Athletic F.C. players
Albion Rovers F.C. players
Scottish Football League players
English Football League players
Association football inside forwards
Third Lanark A.C. players
Scottish Junior Football Association players